Czajka is a Polish surname. Notable people with the surname include:

 Eugeniusz Czajka (1927–2011), Polish field hockey player
 Jerzy Czajka (born 1942), Polish field hockey player
 , Polish computer scientist

See also
 

Polish-language surnames